Lactoperoxidase is a peroxidase enzyme secreted from mammary, salivary and other mucosal glands including the lungs, bronchii and nose  that functions as a natural and the first line of defense against bacteria and viruses. Lactoperoxidase is a member of the heme peroxidase family of enzymes.  In humans, lactoperoxidase is encoded by the LPO gene.

Lactoperoxidase catalyzes the oxidation of several inorganic and organic substrates by hydrogen peroxide. These substrates include bromide and iodide and therefore lactoperoxidase can be categorised as a haloperoxidase. An other important substrate is thiocyanate. The oxidized products produced through the action of this enzyme have potent and non-specific bactericidal and antiviral activities, including destruction of the influenza virus. Lactoperoxidase together with its inorganic ion substrates, hydrogen peroxide, and oxidized products is known as the lactoperoxidase system. Hence LPO is considered a very important defense against invasive bacteria and viral agents such as influenza and the SARS-CoV-2 virus when sufficient iodine is provided.

The lactoperoxidase system plays an important role in the innate immune system by killing bacteria in milk and mucosal (linings of mostly endodermal origin, covered in epithelium, which are involved in absorption and secretion) secretions hence  augmentation of the lactoperoxidase system may have therapeutic applications.   Furthermore, addition or augmentation of the lactoperoxidase system has potential applications in controlling bacteria in food and consumer health care products. The lactoperoxidase system does not attack DNA and is not mutagenic. However, under certain conditions, the lactoperoxidase system may contribute to oxidative stress. Furthermore, lactoperoxidase may contribute to the initiation of breast cancer, through its ability to oxidize estrogenic hormones producing free radical intermediates.

Structure 

The structure of lactoperoxidase consists mainly of alpha-helices plus two short antiparallel beta-strands. Lactoperoxidase belongs to the heme peroxidase family of mammalian enzymes that also includes myeloperoxidase (MPO), eosinophil peroxidase (EPO), thyroid peroxidase (TPO), and prostaglandin H synthase (PGHS). A heme cofactor is bound near the center of the protein.

Function 

Lactoperoxidase catalyzes the hydrogen peroxide (H2O2) oxidation of several acceptor molecules:

 reduced acceptor + H2O2 → oxidized acceptor + H2O

Specific examples include:

 thiocyanate (SCN−)  → hypothiocyanite (OSCN−)
 bromide (Br−) → hypobromite (BrO−)
 iodide (I−) → hypoiodite (IO−)

Source of the hydrogen peroxide (H2O2) usually is the reaction of glucose with oxygen in the presence of the enzyme glucose oxidase that also takes place in saliva. Glucose, in turn, can be formed from starch in the presence of the saliva enzyme amyloglucosidase.

These relatively short lived oxidized intermediates have potent bactericidal effects, hence lactoperoxidase is part of the antimicrobial defense system in tissues that express lactoperoxidase. The lactoperoxidase system is effective in killing a range of aerobic and certain anaerobic microorganisms. Research (1984): "The effect of lactoperoxidase-thiocyanate-hydrogen peroxide mixtures on bacteria is dependent on experimental conditions. If the bacteria are cultured after the exposure to lactoperoxidase-thiocyanate-hydrogen peroxide on nutrient agar under aerobic conditions, they may not grow, whereas they grow readily on blood agar under anaerobic conditions." In its antimicrobial capacity, lactoperoxidase appears to acts synergistically with lactoferrin and lysozyme.

Applications 

Lactoperoxidase is an effective antimicrobial and antiviral agent. Consequently, applications of lactoperoxidase are being found in preserving food, cosmetics, and ophthalmic solutions. Furthermore, lactoperoxidase have found application in dental and wound treatment. Finally lactoperoxidase may find application as anti-tumor and anti viral agents. Lactoperoxidase has been used with radioactive iodine to selectively label membrane surfaces.

Dairy products 

Lactoperoxidase is an effective antimicrobial agent and is used as an antibacterial agent in reducing bacterial microflora in milk and milk products. Activation of the lactoperoxidase system by addition of hydrogen peroxide and thiocyanate extends the shelf life of refrigerated raw milk. It is fairly heat resistant and is used as an indicator of overpasteurization of milk.

Oral care 

A lactoperoxidase system is claimed to appropriate for the treatment of gingivitis and paradentosis. Lactoperoxidase has been used in toothpaste or a mouthrinse to reduce oral bacteria and consequently the acid produced by those bacteria.

Cosmetics 

A combination of lactoperoxidase, glucose, glucose oxidase (GOD), iodide and thiocyanate is claimed to be effective in the preservations of cosmetics.

Cancer 

Antibody conjugates of glucose oxidase and to lactoperoxidase have been found to effective in killing tumor cells in vitro. In addition, macrophages exposed to lactoperoxidase are stimulated to kill cancer cells. Knockout mice deficient in lactoperoxidase suffer ill-health and develop tumors.

Clinical significance

Innate immune system 

The antibacterial and anti-viral activities of lactoperoxidase play an important role in the mammalian immune defense system; the lactoperoxidase system is considered the first line of defense against airborne bacteria and viral agents. Importantly, lactoperoxidase is also extruded into the lung, bronchii and nasal mucus.

Hypothiocyanite is one of the reactive intermediates produced by the activity of lactoperoxidase on thiocyanate and hydrogen peroxide produced by dual oxidase 2 proteins, also known as Duox2. Thiocyanate secretion in cystic fibrosis patients is decreased, resulting in a reduced production of the antimicrobial hypothiocyanite and consequently contributes to increased risk of airway infection.

Viral infections 

Peroxidase-generated hypoiodous acid (HOI), hypoiodite and hypothiocyanite all destroy the herpes simplex virus and human immunodeficiency virus. Both the hypothiocyanite and the hypoiodate ion products are very potent and importantly non-specific antiviral oxidants which are lethal, even in small concentrations, to the influenza virus. The anti-viral activity of lactoperoxidase is enhanced with increasing concentrations of iodide ion. This enzyme has been shown effective against a highly dangerous and tough RNA virus (poliovirus) and a long-lived DNA virus (vaccina).

Bacterial infections 

The duox2-lactoperoxidase system has been shown to offer protection against many dozens of bacteria and mycoplasmas including varieties of the clinically important Staphylococcus and many Streptococcus types. The lactoperoxidase system efficiently inhibits the common helicobacter pylori in buffer; however, in whole human saliva, it seems to have a weaker effect against this microbe. It has been shown that lactoperoxidase in the presence of thiocyanide can catalyze the bactericidal and cytotoxic effects of hydrogen peroxide under specific conditions when hydrogen peroxide is present in excess of thiocyanide. The combination of lactoperoxidase, hydrogen peroxide and thiocyanide is much more effective than hydrogen peroxide alone to inhibit bacterial metabolism and growth.

Breast cancer 

The oxidation of estradiol by lactoperoxidase is a possible source of oxidative stress in breast cancer. The ability of lactoperoxidase to propagate a chain reaction leading to oxygen consumption and intracellular hydrogen peroxide accumulation could explain the hydroxyl radical-induced DNA base lesions recently reported in female breast cancer tissue. Lactoperoxidase may be involved in breast carcinogenesis, because of its ability to interact with estrogenic hormones and oxidise them through two one-electron reaction steps. Lactoperoxidase reacts with the phenolic A-ring of estrogens to produce reactive free radicals. In addition, lactoperoxidase may activate carcinogenic aromatic and heterocyclic amines and increase binding levels of activated products to DNA, which suggests a potential role of lactoperoxidase-catalyzed activation of carcinogens in the causation of breast cancer.

Oral Care 

During the last decades, several clinical studies describing the clinical efficacy of the lactoperoxidase system in a variety of oral care products (tooth pastes, mouth rinses) have been published. After showing indirectly, by means of measuring experimental gingivitis and caries parameters, that mouth rinses containing amyloglucosidase (γ-amylase) and glucose oxidase activate the lactoperoxidase system, the protective mechanism  of the enzymes in oral care products has been partially elucidated. Enzymes such as lysozyme, lactoperoxidase and glucose oxidase are transferred from the tooth pastes to the pellicle. Being components of the pellicle, these enzymes are catalytically highly active. Also, as part of tooth pastes, the lactoperoxidase system has a beneficial influence to avoid early childhood caries by reducing the number of colonies formed by the cariogenic microflora while increasing the thiocyanate concentration. With xerostomia patients, tooth pastes with the lactoperoxidase system are seemingly superior to fluoride-containing tooth pastes with respect to plaque formation and gingivitis. More studies are required to examine further the protective mechanisms.

The application of lactoperoxidase is not restricted to caries, gingivitis, and periodontitis. A combination of lysozyme and lactoperoxidase can be applied to support the treatment of the burning mouth syndrome (glossodynia). In combination with lactoferrin, lactoperoxidase combats halitosis; in combination with lactoferrin and lysozyme, lactoperoxidase helps to improve symptoms of xerostomia. Furthermore, gels with lactoperoxidase help to improve symptoms of oral cancer when saliva production is compromised due to irradiation. In this case, also the oral bacterial flora are influenced favorably.

See also 
 Respiratory tract antimicrobial defense system

References

Further reading

External links 
 

EC 1.11.1
Spanish-American culture in Florida